Claude Stéphane Seanla (born 2 June 1988) is an Ivorian retired footballer who played as a striker.

Career
Seanla was born in Abidjan, Ivory Coast. He started his career at Tottenham Hotspur, and hit 6 goals in 11 starts in an injury hit campaign for Spurs' reserve team in 2005–06, having scored 11 goals in 18 starts the season before.

Seanla signed his first professional forms for Watford in June 2006, following a trial spell. He made his first professional appearance on 19 September 2006, coming on a substitute for Al Bangura for the second half of extra time in the League Cup second round victory over Accrington Stanley.

Seanla left Vicarage Road by mutual consent in February 2007, having made just one appearance for the first team. The following month, he joined Conference North side Kettering Town after impressing for their reserve side, scoring four times in two games. He was released at the end of 2006–07 season following Kettering's failure to win promotion from the Conference North.

On 30 July 2007, he signed for Football League Two side Barnet on a free transfer after a successful trial. On 9 November 2007, he joined St Albans City on a month's loan.  In January 2008, Seanla was transfer listed. He struggled when played out of position in midfield, and played only five times for the Bees. In March, he was loaned out to Wivenhoe Town.  He failed to make an impression even at this level, however, and shortly after his loan spell was cancelled, he was released by Barnet.

On his debut for Ashford Town, he scored two goals in the second half in a 3–2 loss to Chipstead. He scored five goals in eight games, but was unable to add to that tally due to injury, and joined Horsham in January 2009. Seanla's impressive strike rate for Horsham saw him join promotion hopefuls Boreham Wood in March 2010. He scored the only goal of a play-off semi-final against Aveley F.C. and helped contribute to a play-off final win against Kingstonian to seal promotion for the club.

On his debut for Tonbridge Angels, Seanla scored two goals against AFC Hornchurch in the Angels' 7–1 victory against the Essex team. He later played for Winslow United.

In August 2013, he joined Bedford Town, before joining Leighton Town for the 2014–15 season. He carried on playing the SSML from 2015 onwards, playing for Clean Slate and New Bradwell St Peter. Seanla stated in a June 2018 interview that he had retired from football.

References

External links 
 
 Profile on Kettering Town Site
 Profile on Barnet Site
 Soccerdata Stéphane Seanla

1988 births
Living people
Footballers from Abidjan
Ivorian footballers
Association football forwards
English Football League players
National League (English football) players
Isthmian League players
Southern Football League players
Watford F.C. players
Kettering Town F.C. players
Barnet F.C. players
St Albans City F.C. players
Wivenhoe Town F.C. players
Ashford United F.C. players
Horsham F.C. players
Boreham Wood F.C. players
Tonbridge Angels F.C. players
Concord Rangers F.C. players
Crawley Down Gatwick F.C. players
Walton & Hersham F.C. players
Arlesey Town F.C. players
Aylesbury F.C. players
Chesham United F.C. players
Winslow United F.C. players
Bedford Town F.C. players
Leighton Town F.C. players
New Bradwell St Peter F.C. players
Berkhamsted F.C. players